Sewari or Sewadi is a village located in the Bali Tehsil of Pali district of Rajasthan state, amidst the Aravalli Range. There is also a dam nearby with the same name.

Demographics
The population of Sewari is 8,844 according to the 2001 census. Male population is 4,356 and female population is 4,488.

References

 Sewari, map,weather, airport,route
 Sewari Population
 Sewari on Google map
 From Sewari (District Pali), Kushan Period

External links
 Sewari on Wikimapia

Villages in Pali district